The Death of Ivan Ilyich (also Romanized Ilich, Ilych, Ilyitch), first published in 1886, is a novella by Leo Tolstoy, considered one of the masterpieces of his late fiction, written shortly after his religious conversion of the late 1870s.

Considered to be one of the finest examples of a novella, The Death of Ivan Ilyich tells the story of a high-court judge in 19th-century Russia and his sufferings and death from a terminal illness.

Plot

Characters
Ivan Ilyich Golovin (Ilyich is a patronymic, his surname is Golovin) is a highly regarded official of the Court of Justice, described by Tolstoy as, "neither as cold and formal as his elder brother nor as wild as the younger, but was a happy mean between them—an intelligent, polished, lively, and agreeable man." As the story progresses, he becomes more and more introspective and emotional as he ponders the reason for his agonizing illness and death.
Praskovya Fëdorovna Golovin is Ivan's unsympathetic wife. She is characterized as self-absorbed and uninterested in her husband's struggles, unless they directly affect her.
Gerasim is the Golovins' young butler. He takes on the role of sole comforter and caretaker during Ivan's illness.
Peter Ivanovich is Ivan's longtime friend and colleague. He studied law with Ivan and is the first to recognize Ivan's impending death.
Vasia is Ivan's son.
Lisa Golovin is Ivan's daughter.
Fëdor Petrishchev is Lisa's fiancé.

Plot summary

Ivan Ilyich lives a carefree life that is "most simple and most ordinary and therefore most terrible". Like everyone he knows, he spends his life climbing the social ladder. Enduring marriage to a woman whom he often finds too demanding, he works his way up to be a magistrate, thanks to the influence he has over a friend who has just been promoted, focusing more on his work as his family life becomes less tolerable.
 
While hanging curtains for his new home one day, he falls awkwardly and hurts his side. Though he does not think much of it at first, he begins to suffer from a pain in his side. As his discomfort grows, his behavior towards his family becomes more irritable. His wife finally insists that he visit a physician. The physician cannot pinpoint the source of his malady, but soon it becomes clear that his condition is terminal. Confronted with his diagnosis, Ivan attempts every remedy he can to obtain a cure for his worsening situation, until the pain grows so intense that he is forced to cease working and spend the remainder of his days in bed. Here, he is brought face to face with his mortality and realizes that, although he knows of it, he does not truly grasp it.
 
During the long and painful process of dying, Ivan dwells on the idea that he does not deserve his suffering because he has lived rightly. If he had not lived a good life, there could be a reason for his pain; but he has, so pain and death must be arbitrary and senseless. As he begins to hate his family for avoiding the subject of his death, for pretending he is only sick and not dying, he finds his only comfort in his peasant boy servant, Gerasim, the only person in Ivan's life who does not fear death, and also the only one who, apart from his own son, shows compassion for him. Ivan begins to question whether he has, in fact, lived a good life.
 
In the final days of his life, Ivan makes a clear split between an artificial life, such as his own, which masks the true meaning of life and makes one fear death, and an authentic life, the life of Gerasim. Authentic life is marked by compassion and sympathy, the artificial life by self-interest. Then "some force" strikes Ivan in the chest and side, and he is brought into the presence of a bright light. His hand falls onto his nearby son's head, and Ivan pities his son. He no longer hates his daughter or wife, but rather feels pity for them, and hopes his death will release them. In so doing, his terror of death leaves him, and as Tolstoy suggests, death itself disappears.

Interpretation
In 1984, philosopher Merold Westphal said that the story depicts "death as an enemy which: 

(1) leads us to deceive ourselves, 

(2) robs us of the meaning of life, and 

(3) puts us in solitary confinement." 

In 1997, psychologist Mark Freeman wrote:

Indeed, the mundane portrayal of Ivan's life coupled with the dramatization of his long and grueling battle with death seems to directly reflect Tolstoy's theories about moral living, which he largely derived during his sabbatical from personal and professional duties in 1877. In his lectures on Russian literature, Russian-born novelist and critic Vladimir Nabokov argues that, for Tolstoy, a sinful life (such as Ivan's) is moral death. Therefore, death, the return of the soul to God, is, for Tolstoy, moral life. To quote Nabokov: "The Tolstoyan formula is: Ivan lived a bad life and since the bad life is nothing but the death of the soul, then Ivan lived a living death; and since beyond death is God's living light, then Ivan died into a new life – Life with a capital L."

Death permeates the narrative in a realistic and absorbing fashion, but the actual physicality of death is only present in the early chapters during Ivan's wake. Instead, the story leads the reader through a pensive, metaphysical exploration of the reason for death and what it means to truly live. Tolstoy was a man who struggled greatly with self-doubt and spiritual reflection, especially as he grew close to his own death in 1910. In his book A Confession, Tolstoy writes:

This personal epiphany caused significant spiritual upheaval in Tolstoy's life, prompting him to question the Russian Orthodox Church, sexuality, education, serfdom, etc. The literature Tolstoy composed during this period is some of his most controversial and philosophical, among which falls The Death of Ivan Ilyich and other famous short stories such as The Kreutzer Sonata and The Devil. From a biographical standpoint, therefore, it is possible to interpret The Death of Ivan Ilyich as a manifestation of Tolstoy's embroilment with death and the meaning of his own life during his final years. In other words, by dramatizing a particular sort of lifestyle and its unbearable decline, Tolstoy is able to impart his philosophy that success as it is judged by society, such as Ivan Ilyich's, comes at a great moral cost and if one decides to pay this cost, life will become hollow and insincere and therefore worse than death.

Martin Heidegger's magnum opus, Being and Time (1927), refers to the novella as an illustration of Being towards death.

English translations
 Aylmer and Louise Maude
Constance Garnett (1902)
 Rosemary Edmonds (1960)
 Lynn Solotaroff (1981)
 Ian Dreiblatt (2008)
 Richard Pevear and Larissa Volokhonsky (2009)
 Kirsten Lodge

Adaptations 

Film 
 Ikiru (1952) directed by Akira Kurosawa
 A Simple Death (1985) directed by Alexander Kaidanovsky
 Ivans Xtc (2000) directed by Bernard Rose
 The Last Step (2005) directed by Ali Mosaffa
 Living (2022) directed by Oliver Hermanus
Opera
 Death of Ivan Ilych: A Full-Length Chamber Opera in One Act (2021) Composed by John Young with libretto by Alan Olejniczak. A Co-Partnership Premiere with Opera Orlando and Thompson Street Opera Company.

See also
 Leo Tolstoy bibliography

References

External links

 English text
 The Death of Ivan Ilyich, at RevoltLib.com
 The Death of Ivan Ilyich, at TheAnarchistLibrary.org
 The Death of Ivan Ilyich, at Marxists.org
 The Death of Ivan Ilyich, and Other Stories, at Archive.org
 The Death of Ivan Ilyich, at CompareTranslations.com
 The Death of Ivan Ilyich, at CCEL.org
 English Audio
 
 Russian Text
 The Death of Ivan Ilyich, at ilibrary.ru

1886 Russian novels
Fiction about law
Novellas by Leo Tolstoy
Novels about death
Novels set in 19th-century Russia
Philosophical literature
Russian novels adapted into films
Russian philosophy